This is a list of characters in the manga and anime series Mirmo!.

The main characters are four human teenagers and their fairy partners (called "muglox" according to ShoPro/Viz Media materials). Each set of four has complicated relationships which are the driving force of the story. In addition, there is a large cast of supporting characters, including regular characters, some of whom change with each arc (original, Wonderful, Golden, and Enchanted seasons, as well from the Murumoya fansite; for details, see List of Mirmo! media). The fairies use musical instruments as their magical tools.

Main characters

Fairies
  / Mirmo 
 The fairy protagonist of the series. A cute fairy (whose height is 10 cm) who is playful but at times selfish and lazy. He is Katie's partner and Yatch's rival, as well as the prince of the Fairy World and Murumo's older brother. Although he is Rima's fiancé, he refuses to marry her because he only likes her as a friend. He uses a pair of maracas as his magic tools. His favorite dessert is Chocolates and KumoCho (short for "Cloud Chocolate"). As a member of the Royal Family, he can turn humans into fairies for 24 hours. He also apparently favors butting people with his famous "Butt Fist" on weak enemies who do not require hard attacks.  (First appearance: episode 1)

  / Rima 
 A pretty female fairy (with a height of 9.5 cm) who is Dylan's partner. She loves Mirmo and wants to marry him, much to his disappointment. She is Mirmo's fiancée, and tries to get along with Mirmo on dates. At times, she may look very cute and innocent, but she can actually be quite aggressive. Rima is not exactly the champion when it comes to magic and household chores, and she even makes magical situations worse if she "helps." She cooks food for Mirmo, but instead of Mirmo eating it, he keeps avoiding her because of the food's appearance and taste (they all look weird and inedible). She uses a tambourine as her magic tool. Her favorite dessert is cream puffs. She marries Mirmo in the final chapter of the manga. (First appearance: episode 1)

  / Yatch 
 Like his partner Azumi, Yatch is brash and impatient with his henchmen, Sazo and Hanzo. He continues to annoy Mirumo to no end due to their long-standing rivalry. But even if Yatch and Mirmo are always fighting, they help each other to save their partners and other people. He is a ninja, due to his ninja-like weapons and looks. Because of that, he is very skilled and gifted in his instrument, which you can tell during his magical dance, because he can hit his Triangle at the exact right beats with only one hand, holding the hitter and not holding the Triangle. Although unfriendly at times, he helps the others when it all depends on him. He's also fond of looking at people's underwear and drawing pictures of them (which he consider precious), much to Azumi's embarrassment. Yatch dislikes Azumi since she treats him like a slave and makes him clean the house all day, but he knows that he cannot go on without her. He is an avid fan and former executive apprentice of the Warumo Gang, and uses a triangle as his magic tool. His favorite food is karintos. (First appearance: episode 2)

  / Mulu 
 An immature, cute little fairy (with a height of 8 cm) who is Mirmo's younger brother and Kyle’s partner. Mulu loves marshmallows as much as Mirmo loves chocolate, and he uses his personality to relax or manipulate others to get what he wants. At times, he is kind and sweet to his friends and is willing to help them when they are in trouble. But he can also be greedy and selfish when it comes to marshmallows, and will do anything to make Kyle give him some (even telling him about Katie and Dylan's dates). He commonly uses the phrases “deshu” or “mashu.” When he is angry, he uses the two “antenna” on his hat to create lightning and electrocute the offender. It is called "Electric Beam!" He uses a snare drum as his magic tool. (First appearance: episode 1)

Humans
  / Katie Minami 
 Age: 13-14
 The human protagonist and a cheerful and energetic girl who is Mirmo's human partner. Though friendly and always willing to help those in need, she can get angry when she is tempted. Katie's main love interest is Dylan Yuki, and is the romantic rival of Azumi. Her results to grab his attention are mediocre as a result of her clumsiness. During season one of the anime, she attended the fairy school with Mirmo, but she is very different in her fairy form compared to the normal citizens of the Fairy World, with fairy wings, a pink fairy outfit, and her instrument, a microphone which was destroyed at the end of the first season while she was trying to save Fairy world. In episode 142, she almost died as a shinigami stole her soul for Mirmo's chocolates. At the season finale of Mirmo Zibang, Katie struggles to fight for Dylan's love. Unfortunately, Dylan made a decision that broke her heart, by choosing to be with Haruka Morishita. Katie decided to give up her chance of being with Dylan but not her feelings for him. Later on, when Dylan realizes that Katie is the one he really loves, he decided to confess his feelings to her. 
 In the final episode of the anime, Katie loses Mirmo in replacement for her wish to come true, then finds out that Mirmo never made to the Fairy World and received an extreme punishment. She then tries her best to bring back Mirmo's memories of him being a fairy, and in the end, she gets Mirumo back. In the manga, after she and Dylan become a couple, another tomboy rival named Ryo Sanada appears. (First appearance: episode 1)

  / Dylan Yuki  
 Age: 13-14
 A smart and quiet bookworm (and an honor student), on whom Katie and Azumi have crushes, and who is Rima's partner. Although he is silent, cool, calm and reading most of the time, he's willing to help his friends, even if it embarrasses him. It is a bit mysterious who he liked first, Katie or Azumi, since he went out with Katie in the first season of the anime. He is also afraid to eat green peppers. In the near end of season four, when Haruka Morishita, his childhood friend confesses her strong love for him, he begins to gradually get close to her. When Haruka makes her decision to set Dylan free because she knew that Katie is the one he really loves, she tells Dylan that he should do something or else he will lose the person he wants. After his small argument with Rima, he goes home and he looks like he is thinking of something very deep. He then decides to call Katie and ask her to meet him at the park and asks her if she can bring a watch. At the park he tells Katie about how he feels and finally confesses to her. Gladly, Katie, of course, accepts his proposal. (First appearance: episode 1)

   
 Age: 13-14
 Birthday: November 11
 A brash and impatient girl who loves Dylan Yuki and is rivals with Katie. She often beats up Katie whenever she sees Katie with Dylan, usually a funny sneak attack. She can be very vain at times, but helps her friends if she decides to. She's partners (or more like partner-in-crimes) with Yatch since Azumi wants Dylan and hates Katie, just how Yatch hates Mirmo. But most of the time, she leaves Yashichi to do her household chores and treats him like a slave, but seems to have a soft spot for him. She also has a younger brother named Mizuki but is rarely seen. At the near end of anime season four, Azumi challenged Katie to know who really is the right one for Dylan. Katie wins at the end of the battle. Azumi accepted her loss but warned Katie and said that "if she starts doing the wrong thing again, she will never let Katie take that chance again." In the manga, after she broke up with Dylan, she went dating with Sumita and Hirai but failed, and she is the idol of Sazo and Hanzo. (First appearance: episode 1)

  / Kyle Matsutake  
 Age: 13-14
 A very rich boy who is popular among girls, but he seems to hate it. Kyle's playful attitude makes him friends with Katie (the girl of his dreams) and Mulu. He would do anything (with his gigantic fortune, of course) to be Katie's boyfriend, but her crush on Dylan blocks that, much to Kyle's chagrin. He has his own butler/security guard/caretaker, and relies heavily on him. Although he may not show it, he is a cry baby and spoiled, once when he fell on his rear end, he had an entire set of medical machines and when everyone left, he started bawling, but he can hide it just as fast, like when Katie enters the room. But he is still spoiled, as showed when he met Katie and his heart beat increased, his butler then considered bringing in an entire team of doctors. In the season finale, Kyle managed to propose to Katie, but Katie turned him down, causing him to act and look like an old man (his way of showing his heartbroken self). Katie and Mirmo also concluded that Kyle might still be famous (especially to girls) even in his old days. (First appearance: episode 9)

Supporting characters

Regular cast

   
 Katie's best friend who is captain of the volleyball team. Despite being best friends with Katie, she is entirely unaware of the existence of the fairy world. She, at first, had a crush on Kyle, but that soon faded and eventually started dating Kanna Haijime. (First appearance: episode 1)

  
 Katie's homeroom teacher that thinks Amanda (a rabbit taken care by Katie and Koichi which is shown in the last season) is very cute. (First appearance: episode 1)

  / Sazo 
 One of Yatch's lackeys. He is dressed in purple. He has a crush on Yamane. He often ends his sentences with the phrase "-daze". His instrument is a glockenspiel (apparently both he and Hanzo use xylophones). In the Filipino version, he is called Saske (same as in the Japanese version) instead of Sazo. (First appearance: episode 8)

  
 One of Yatch's lackeys. He is dressed in green. He seems to be the least intelligent of the three, but he also has a few unique skills, which is unexpected of him. He often ends his sentences with the phrase "-nanora". He once was able to effortlessly pronounce an extremely difficult tongue twister spell. His instrument is a vibraphone. (First appearance: episode 8)

  
 Kyle's butler since early childhood. He is skilled in everything and will do anything to please his young master. He even did his master's entire summer assignment. He and Hoshino are long-time rivals, but they have a soft side for each other. (First appearance: episode 9)

  
 The show's regular troublemakers. In the first season they plot to take over the Fairy Kingdom. In the second season they become lackeys for Dark. In the third and fourth seasons they constantly cause trouble for Mirmo and his friends, but their tricks always fail due to their clumsiness. Their magical tools are shamisen. (First appearance: episode 15)
  (Red) - The leader of the group, though the other four are against it. He has the thickest eyebrows compared to the other members. Usually, when he finishes talking, the other four would repeat the last thing he says. He was a delivery man before joining the Warumo Gang. 
  (Blue) - He wears a monocle on his left eye. He was a millionaire celebrity before joining the Warumo Gang. He is considered the brains of the group. 
  (Green) - He has a scar near his left eye, though it is never really shown in the anime. He was working at a construction site before joining the Warumo Gang. He is the strongest member. 
  (Pink) - He has light brown hair on his left and right sides. He was working as an idol before joining the Warumo Gang. It is revealed in one episode that he is the youngest member of the gang, which shows that their ages are not in order from oldest to youngest. 
  (Yellow) - The dumbest member of the Warumo Gang. He is very clumsy and often guessed wrong things the other four are going to say. He is usually the one who cooks for the gang. He was a masked wrestler before joining the Warumo Gang, but he had never won once due to how weak he was. 

  
 Otome is a crossdresser who was Yatch's first love and initially mistaken as a male. Yatch goes out with him but was shocked to find out that Otome grew a mustache due to excitement. His tool is a flute. His first human partner is Naomi, an artist who moved to Paris to pursue her career. His second human partner is a good looking young man who caught the attention of Azumi. (First appearance: episode 22)

  
 A female fairy who admires Mulu. Although they always quarrel when they meet, they in fact have a soft side for each other. In the fourth season, she becomes a main character and is the fairy partner of Koichi Sumita (from episode 152). Her tool is a handbell. (First appearance: episode 28)

  
 Yamane's human partner. She loves Kyle Matsutake. She is the only daughter of an equally wealthy family as the Matsutake's (but apparently wealthier) and she treats Katie as a rival, always calling her "oba-san" ("auntie" or "granny"). Because of Kumomo's clumsiness, she became partners with Yamane. (First appearance: episode 68)

  
 Momo's butler. She is the female counterpart of Hirai. She and Hirai are long-time rivals, but they a soft side for each other. (First appearance: episode 68)

  
 A ninja fairy, the younger sister of Nezumi and thus Yatch's cousin. She admires Yatch and often joins him on his ninja training (although her ninja skills are far superior to Yatch's). Her human partner is Momo Umezono. In the second season she is temporary possessed by Dark, which forces Nezumi to join Darkman as "Rat" in order to save her. Her tool is a bird whistle. When she eats anything sweet, she becomes drunk and causes destruction to her surroundings. (First appearance: episode 72)

  
Momiji is Katie's mother. She is an easily frightened housewife. Momiji is oblivious of the existence of the fairy world, however she had encountered and befriended creatures from said world. On the other hand, she thinks Katie is crazy when she is seemingly talking to herself; when Katie is actually talking to Mirmo.

Golden Edition characters 

  / Ivol 
 A mischievous fairy who is always causing trouble for Mirumo and his friends during the second season. She admires Dark and is the first to join him. After Dark is destroyed for good, she changes from her evil form, becomes Saori's partner, and leaves with her for Germany. Her magic tool is a sitar. Her favorite food is caramel. (First appearance: (as villain) episode 50; (as protagonist) episode 101)

  Darkman 
 The main villain in the second season. His appearance is different in the manga and anime: while the manga shows him as a fairy, the anime shows him as a navy-skinned human with elfish ears. Despite being evil, he still shows a few goofy sides of him. Long ago, he tried to dominate the fairy world, but was defeated by the Gaia Tribe and sealed away. He recruits Akumi and the Warumo Gang to help him break free from his seal and defeat Mirumo and his friends. While on the verge of breaking free, Mirumo and his team enter his world and defeat him. He is sealed away again by the Gaias, but it is later revealed that they only sealed part of him: he encountered Yamane while being sealed and possessed her with part of his spirit. He recruits Akumi and the Warumo Gang again, along with a new agent, "Rat", to continue causing trouble for Mirumo and his friends, and approaches Saori Eguchi in the guise of Takumi Kiryuu, Saori's old music teacher. He is destroyed for good when Saori's powers are upgraded while the Gaia Tribe and the other fairy did a magical chant. Like Enma, he also spreads cold jokes. (First appearance: episode 53)

  
 A ninja fairy, who is Yamane's older brother and Yashichi's cousin. Nezumi is quite caring for his sister and overprotective for her, often citing that Yashichi is not a worthy partner for her. In the second half of the Golden Edition, on learning that Yamane had been possessed by Dark, he reluctantly joined him under the name "Rat" to save his sister. (First appearance as Nezumi episode 38, as Rat episode 82)

  
 A quiet girl who is a professional flute player. Although she is a generally silent beauty and a bookworm like Setsu, she has one quirk: she sneezes whenever someone mentions a thing about love around her. She is able to see fairies because she was under the control of Dark, which during the whole season uses her powers to spread his evil into the human world. After episode 78, she is no longer as quiet. She eventually destroys Dark for good when her powers are upgraded. At the end of season 2, she leaves Japan to study music in Germany. She is Kaede's most important friend. (First appearance: episode 54)

  
 Saori's music teacher, who taught her to play the flute as a child. He is very kind but is also a little clumsy. He appeared as the new teacher and helped Saori regain confidence in her flute skills. However, during the final battle with Dark, the main characters find out that Kiryuu is Dark in disguise.
The real Takumi Kiryuu appears shortly after Dark's demise. His appearance is different from Dark's disguise, in that he now appears older and has grown a goatee. He takes Saori to Germany to study music at the end of the season. (First appearance: episode 99, although Dark first disguised as him in episode 82)

Wonderful Edition characters 

 Takosu/ 
 An octopus robot in the Crystal Land. He travels to the human world to collect the seven sacred crystals in order to save his girlfriend and the Crystal Land. At the end of the third season, he became the king of the Crystal Land. He used his mouth to take out accessories. In the Filipino version he is called Pogito and Takolo in Italian version. (First appearance: episode 103)

  
 A squid robot in the Crystal Land. He is initially a rival with Takosu. At the end of the season, he becomes Takosu's royal adviser. He is called Posito in the Filipino-dubbed version. (First appearance: episode 115)

Charming Edition characters 

  
 A fairy who accidentally halfway died and is now a spirit. He loves to play with Mirumo, who is scared of him. His partner is Haruka Morishita, who used an octopus to summon him. It is revealed that he saw Haruka seven years ago but was not able to meet her before he died. His tool is a ukulele. (First appearance: episode 153)

  
 A childhood friend of Dylan. Her ambition is to become a manga artist. She is very kind but is even scarier than Azumi when angry, usually with a smile that scares other characters (Dylan once says that as a child, his worst fear was Haruka getting angry). In the anime, she is Panta's human partner and still has feelings for Dylan. This causes Dylan to break up with Katie for a while. When Haruka realizes that Dylan's true love is Katie, she finally gives up on him. At the end of the series she is dating Koichi Sumita. (First appearance: episode 154)

  
 A very shy person who likes Katie, and has confessed to her. Once, because of Azumi, Hanzo, and Sazo, he and Katie accidentally kissed. He is good at sports and has two younger twin sisters. Like Mirmo, he likes chocolates and KumoCho. He always supports Katie. At the end of the season, he is dating Haruka Morishita. (First appearance: episode 151)

Mirumo's friends and family

Mirmo's family

  
 King of the Fairy World and father of Mirmo and Mulu. He has a similar personality to Mirmo, and is often quarreling with him. His magic tool is a bass drum. He gets scared every time his wife gets angry. He gets angry with Mirmo when his son says he looks ugly with his mustache. His favorite dessert is pudding. (First appearance: episode 1)

  / Sara 
 Queen of the Fairy World and mother of Mirumo and Murumo. She loves her husband dearly. She is always seen with a smile and is very kind to others, but when she gets angry, she unleashes an energy so great that it could almost destroy the world. Her husband is usually the cause and target when she gets angry. Her magic tool is a harp. (First appearance: episode 1)

  
 Grandmother of Mirmo and Mulu, she has a stubborn personality and dislikes humans. Her magic tool is an erhu. In Italian version she's called Rosirma. (First appearance: episode 118)

  
 The royal advisor. He had been serving in the palace since King Marumo's birth and is loyal to him. (First appearance: episode 1)

  
 The royal doctor of the Fairy World. (First appearance: episode 58)

  
 The royal tutor of the Fairy World. She comes from a long family line of royal tutors, as her father had tutored King Marumo before. She has her way of dealing with troublesome students. She was assigned to tutor Mirmo after he once wreaked havoc on the Fairy Kingdom. (First appearance: episode 136)

Mirmo's classmates

  
 Mirmo's best friend since childhood. He loves to eat doughnuts and always hangs out with Bike. He is a supportive and gentle young boy, but also very sensitive. He dresses in green and white. He even ends his sentences with the phrase "-dabe". His magical instrument is the cymbals. (First appearance: episode 1)

  
 He is always being teased by his friends who call him "uncool". He has a kind elder sister. He also has a skateboard. He dresses in orange and green. His magical instrument is the concertina and likes Konpeitō. (First appearance: episode 16)

  
 "The most beautiful fairy" in the world. He has a crush on Anna. In the Wonderful season he looks in a mirror. He is dressed in a brown cowboy hat. His magical instrument is the cow horn and he likes Mont Blanc. (First appearance: episode 16)

  
 He often thinks negatively. He dresses in purple and black. His magical instrument is the harmonica and likes bubble gum. (First appearance: episode 16)

  
 She and Incho are the smartest pupils of the fairy school, although she is smarter. She dresses in lilac and wears a pince nez glasses. She has a crush on Bike. Her tool is an electric guitar and she likes Apple Pie. (First appearance: episode 16)

  
 She dresses in orange and yellow, and she has a pink heart over her mouth. She is good friends with Anna. Her tools are castanets and likes gummies. Raichi is also known for her strong skill of gossiping. (First appearance: episode 27)

  
 He is smart like Anna, and along with her, is the smartest pupil in the fairy school. His tool is a toy piano that sounds like a grand piano and has the same size as him. He is the class president. He dresses in green, yellow and wears purple square glasses. He also likes to eat Manjū. (First appearance: episode 20)

 
 He is the quietest classmate and only speaks through gestures. He also has a perpetual serious look on his face. His tool is an ocarina and likes to eat a mysterious sherbet. (First appearance: episode 27)

  
 She is very rich, adores fashion, and carries around a red purse over her body. Her tool is a violin. She dresses in red and yellow. (First appearance: episode 27)

  
 He is the class merchant who sells various wares to everyone. He is also skilled in Kung Fu. He dresses in an orange and green Chinese outfit. His tool is a gong and likes spicy food.  (First appearance: episode 27)

Rima's family

   
 Rima's father. (First appearance: episode 29)

  
 Rima's mother. (First appearance: episode 29)

    
 Rima's three siblings.

  
 Yurin is a sweet fairy who is Rima's cousin. In Episode 144, she fell in love with Ichirou, the head of the Warumo Gang, and almost married him, but Ichirou left her to continue trying to take over the kingdom with the rest of the gang. At the very end of the episode, she ends up starting a relationship with Gorou, much to Ichirou's shock. Like her cousin, her instrument is a tambourine.  (First appearance: episode 144)

Mimomo Shop
   
 The owner of Mimomo Shop who looks like a pink bear/raccoon. Although she is a very adorable character when she is in her true form, she is able to transform into an overweight human in order to get around the human world and escape suspicion. A running gag when her is when she does her deliveries in her human form, she appears suddenly in the most strangest places regardless of location and size, giving her human recipients a good startle. She is a genius when it comes to sales, serves both the good fairies as well as the dark ones (such as the Warumo Gang), changing her appearance depending on her customers. She is absent for a while to give birth to her child. In the Tagalog version, Mimomo is male. (First appearance: episode 5)

  
 The assistant and salesperson of Mimomo Shop. She is a cute fairy who rather clumsy and absent minded in her first appearances, but really good at making sweets. Similar to Mimomo, she is able to transform into a human. However, unlike Mimomo, her transformation is a thin woman with a depressed look on her face. She also delivers the same way, sharing the same running gag. She took charge of the store during Mimomo's absence, and continued working in the store after Mimomo's return. She also ends her sentences with a 'kumo'. (First appearance: episode 71)

Mirumo team

  
 The fairy world's dentist. In episode 24, he, Mirumo, and Rirumu shrink and enter in Mulu's mouth to defeat the bacteria that were causing him pain. His tool is a cow bell. He has a crush on Tsutsuji. (First appearance: episode 24)

  
 A very happy fairy who has a red dice block and a white dice block on the sides of his cheeks. His tool is a saxophone. (First appearance: episode 41)

  
 A cute and happy fairy who carries around a net and hangs with Tomon and Chie. She is the Fairy World's newspaper reporter. (First appearance: episode 46)

  
 A fairy who carries around a camera shaped like an apple and hangs with Wakaba and Chie. She is the Fairy World's newspaper photographer. (First appearance: episode 46)

  
 A fairy who likes to read and hangs with Wakaba and Tomon. Her tool is a bugle. She is the Fairy World's newspaper reporter. (First appearance: episode 46)

  
 A fairy dressed in a Sherlock Holmes outfit. His tool is a cello. (First appearance: episode 40)

 Miren 
 A crybaby fairy. He is the ex-boyfriend of Akumi. (First appearance: episode 67)

  
 A fairy who was Muluo's fiance, but with her polite personality and pretty appearance, both Mulu and Mirmo ended up falling in love with her. The royal family arranged a marriage between the two, upsetting Papii when she heard the news. Despite how much Mulu liked Aroma, the wedding ended up getting cancelled, because Mulu had more feelings for Papii than he did for Aroma. Aroma was completely fine with Mulu's decision. Also, her favorite snack is popcorn. (First appearance: episode 95)

  
 Mambo's sister. She and Mambo look alike and have some sense of romance. Her tool is a panpipe. (First appearance: episode 121)

  
 A fairy who is friends with Papii. (First appearance: episode 123)

 
 A fairy thief who wears a top hat. (First appearance: episode 135)

 
 A fairy teacher of a class of six kindergarteners. Her students call her "Tsutsuji-Sensei". In her debut appearance, she is trapped in a box by the Warumo Gang and they take her class away from her, becoming their teachers for the entire episode. By the end, with Mirmo and his friends' help, she reunites with her class unharmed. In one Wonderful Edition episode, she does a circle dance with her students. (First appearance: episode 91)

Gurumi Tribe

  
 The powerful fairy of the Gurumi Tribe. He is dressed up as a bear. He falls in love with Rirumu after being defeated by her in a sumo match. His magical tool is a tsuzumi. (First appearance: episode 31)

  
 A fairy from the Gurumi Tribe who is dressed as a cat. Her magical tool is a recorder. (First appearance: episode 31)

  
 Anri's twin brother. Unlike Anri, he is dressed as a dog. He is also from the Gurumi Tribe. His magical tool is also a recorder. (First appearance: episode 31)

  
 A fairy dressed in a raccoon suit. (First appearance: episode 62)

Gaia Tribe
The Gaia Tribe are elementals of the Fairy World. They have strong powers and can cast magic without using instruments. Although they are "gods," they have the same appearances as the fairies. They first appear in episode 17, where they give Kaede the microphone that allows Mirumo's powers to increase and save the citizens of Kaede's hometown from the Warumo Gang.

   - The Gaian of fire. Favorite food is baked sweet potatoes. 
  - The Gaian of water. Favorite food is Mizuame. 
  - The Gaian of earth.(soil,rocks,etc.) He is quiet and shy. Favorite food is dumplings.  
  - The Gaian of wind. Favorite food is soft served ice cream. 
  - The Gaian of clouds. "Might be the..." is her catchphrase. Favorite food is cotton candy. 
  - A Gaian who takes charge in making and repairing the fairies' magical instruments. (First appearance: Episode 53)

Part-time characters

 Etsumi's grandfather/Kido Gonzo (えつみのおじいちゃん/きどごんぞ)
 A person who used to work with fireworks but decided to stop working. In episode 18, Katie, Rima and Mirmo decided to help Etsumi's grandpa to work with fireworks again. (First appearance: episode 18)

 Kanna Haijime (ハイジメ かんな Haijime Kanna)
 Etsumi's boyfriend. He only appears a few times in the entire series. Like Etsumi, he is unaware of the existence of the fairies. He has black hair and green eyes. He likes to bother Etsumi every time he can. Usually, he hits his tennis racket in her head when she does not see him behind her. In episode 116, he quarrels with Etsumi, and they stop speaking to each other until Kaede, Rima, and Mirmo help them and tell them not to give up their relationship. In episode 116, although Etsumi quarrels with her boyfriend, when he has a tennis competition one day, she makes a type of pendant and wishes Kanna can win the competition. While Yatch, Rima, Mulu, Takosu are cheerleading, Mirmo is just looking around. When Mirmo sees Etsumi holding the pendant and cheering for Kanna's victory, he uses his magic and put her pendant in Kanna's bag. Kanna is checking what's that and when he touches the pendant, he hears Etsumi's true feelings for him. When the message finishes, he looks at Etsumi and shows her the pendant (They look at each other). She has been confused of how that got in his hand and after all of this, Kanna wins the competition because of Etsumi's support. Kaede asks the fairies if any of them had used magic. They say "no" and look to Mirmo, who is gaping. In the last part of the episode, Etsumi is talking with Katie and Kanna comes from back and hits Etsumi in her head with his tennis racket and Etsumi is chasing Kanna as in the beginning of the episode (first appearance: episode 116)

 
One day, she was walking around in the park with her dog who finds Yatch's mug. Before that, Yatch ran away from Azumi's home, taking his mug with him, but later he got trapped in it by accident. Rie followed the instructions that were written under Yatch's mug, so Yatch appears and sees Rie as a very wonderful, organized, and hard working person (compared to Azumi, who is the exact opposite.)

 
 A robot fairy that looks like Mirmo. Mecamo went on a rampage through the Fairy Kingdom. He then became friends with Mirumo. (First appearance: episode 37)

 
 A flying creature in the Fairy World who looks like a seahorse. It is named after its cry.

 
 Karasurume looks like a squid and is always crying.

 
 Blob-like creatures in the Muglox World. In one episode, when the Gaians quarrel amongst themselves, the blobs multiply and threaten to overpopulate in both the fairy and human worlds.

References

Mirmo! Japan Characters
Mirmo! Korea Characters
Mirmo! USA Characters

Mirmo!